Military acquisition or defense acquisition is the "bureaucratic management and procurement process", dealing with a nation's investments in the technologies, programs, and product support necessary to achieve its national security strategy and support its armed forces. Its objective is to acquire products that satisfy specified needs and provide measurable improvement to mission capability at a fair and reasonable price.

Concept 
Military acquisition has a long history spanning from ancient times (e.g., blacksmithing, shipbuilding) to modern times.

Modern military acquisition is a complex blend of science, management, and engineering disciplines within the context of a nation's law and regulation framework to produce military material and technology. This complexity evolved from the increasing complexity of weapon systems starting in the 20th century. For example, the Manhattan Project involved more than 130,000 people at an estimated cost of nearly $24 billion in 2008 dollars.

In the twenty-first century, the trend has been for countries to cooperate in military procurement, due to the rising cost-per-unit of digital age military hardware such as ships and jets.  For example, Nordic Defence Cooperation (established 2009), a grouping of Nordic countries that cooperate in defence spending, the Defence and Security Co-operation Treaty, signed between the United Kingdom and France in 2010, and Joint Strike Fighter program, which selected the Lockheed Martin F-35 Lightning II in 2001, included the United States, the United Kingdom, Australia, Italy, Canada, the Netherlands, Norway, Denmark, Turkey, Israel and Japan.

Activities
Major activities related to military acquisition are:

 Project management/program management
 Risk management
 Earned value management
 Product management
 Product life cycle management
 Contract management
 Systems engineering
 Software engineering
 Computer engineering
 Human factors
 Modeling and simulation
 Security
 Procurement

In the European Union

EU member states' procurement of arms, munitions, war material and related works and services acquired for defence purposes and procurement of sensitive supplies, works and services required for security purposes are subject to EU Directive 2009/81/EC on Defence and Sensitive Security Procurement. The purpose of the directive is to balance the need for transparency and openness in defence markets within the European Single Market with the need to protect individual countries’ security interests.

In the United Kingdom
The Defence and Security Public Contracts Regulations 2011, which were derived from EU law, apply to defence procurement in the UK, along with Parts 1 and 2 of the Defence Reform Act 2014. The Defence Reform Act established a statutory "Single Source" scheme applicable to situations where there is no competition between suppliers.

In the United States
The US Department of Defense has three principal decision-making support systems associated with military acquisition: The Center for Strategic & International Studies releases a report every year on defense acquisition trends.

 Planning, Programming, Budgeting and Execution (PPBE) Process – Process for strategic planning, program development, and resource determination.
 Joint Capabilities Integration and Development System – The systematic method established by the Joint Chiefs of Staff for assessing gaps in military joint warfighting capabilities and recommending solutions to resolve these gaps.
 Defense Acquisition System  – The management process used to acquire weapon systems and automated information system.

Because of the size and scope of such a bureaucracy, the US Department of Defense instituted an extensive training program, known as the Defense Acquisition University.

In Canada
In Canada, military acquisition falls under three separate government departments: the Public Services and Procurement Canada (PSPC); the Department of National Defence (DND); Innovation, Science and Economic Development (ISED).

PSPC is responsible for overseeing and managing the proposal solicitation and evaluation process, and once under contract, PSPC manages the contract on behalf of DND.
DND is responsible for a four step process:
 Identify the need for a new or improved capability;
 Analyze the available options to address the identified need;
 If external procurement is the result of the optional analysis, then defining the requirements and budget for the procured solution; and
 Implementing the defined solution.

ISED is responsible for defining and administering the Industrial and Technological Benefits (ITB) and Value Proposition (VP), which are offsets applied to the selected defense procurements. ISED may apply offsets to DND and Coast Guard procurements of $20M (CAD, or about $15M USD) or greater.

All Canadian defence procurement falls under the auspices of the Treasury Board of Canada, which establishes national procurement and contracting standards and regulations on behalf of the Government of Canada.

See also

Analysis of Alternatives
Defence Equipment and Support (UK)
Defence Materiel Organisation (Australia)
Defense Acquisition University (US)
Integrated Logistics Support
Joint Capabilities Integration Development System
Logistics Support Analysis
Procurement
Under Secretary of Defense for Acquisition, Technology and Logistics
Government procurement - includes details of relevant procurement law affecting defence procurement in a number of other states

Notes

References

External links

 Assistant Secretary of the Air Force for Acquisition (ASAF (A)) 
 Assistant Secretary of the Navy for Research, Development & Acquisition (ASN (RDA)) 
 Defense Acquisition History Project 
 Defense Procurement News 
 United States Assistant Secretary of the Army for Acquisition, Logistics, and Technology (OASA(ALT)) 
 Defense Acquisition University ACC Practice Center